Buffalo Creek is a stream in Crow Wing County, in the U.S. state of Minnesota.

Buffalo Creek was named for the American bison (buffalo) seen there by early settlers.

See also
List of rivers of Minnesota

References

Rivers of Crow Wing County, Minnesota
Rivers of Minnesota